Live & More may refer to:

 Live and More, a 1978 album by Donna Summer
 Live & More Encore, a 1999 album by Donna Summer
 Live & More (Roberta Flack & Peabo Bryson album), released 1980
 Live & More EP, a 1981 Japanese-only release by XTC
 Live and More EP, a 1982 Japanese release by Girlschool
 Live & More (Marcus Miller album), released 1998
 Live and More!, a 2000 video by Britney Spears